Pterolophia idionea is a species of beetle in the family Cerambycidae. It was described by Warren Samuel Fisher in 1927.

References

idionea
Beetles described in 1927